The 1992 Junior Pan American Rhythmic Gymnastics Championships was held in São Paulo, Brazil, December 8–14, 1992.

Medal summary

Junior division

Children's division

References

1992 in gymnastics
Pan American Gymnastics Championships
International gymnastics competitions hosted by Brazil